The Alberta Genealogical Society (AGS) is a non-profit educational organization headquartered at 14315 118 Ave, Edmonton, Alberta, Canada. Founded in 1970, AGS is one of the largest genealogical societies in Canada. Its mission is "to promote interest in genealogy and genealogical research through a provincial association, by providing opportunities for the exchange of genealogical ideas and information." AGS publishes Relatively Speaking, a scholarly magazine and newsletter, and the organization conducts educational programs, and maintains a website with a database for its members and research guides for the general public.

History 
Charles Douglas Denney founded the Alberta Genealogical Society in 1970. Despite the fact that the Alberta Genealogical Society is a Canadian archive, American genealogists such as Beverly Smith Vorpahl have discussed using AGS resources for genealogical work in the Pacific Northwest.

Resources 
The Alberta Genealogical Society houses the Albertan Index to the Registration of Births, Marriages and Deaths, 1870-1905, one copy of which is also accessible at the Provincial Archives of Alberta.

See also 

 Demographics of Alberta

References

External links 
 Official website

1970 establishments in Alberta
Genealogical societies
Organizations based in Edmonton
Family history
Organizations established in 1970